Spencer Speedway opened in 1955 and is a 1/2 mile Flat Asphalt Oval located in Williamson, New York. The track is owned by John White and is currently NASCAR Sanctioned as part of the Whelen All-American Series. The Speedway also has an 1/10 mile drag strip that runs Saturday Night and is NHRA Sanctioned.

The track is most known by held a few NASCAR Busch North Series and NASCAR Whelen Modified Tour races. And also for being part of NASCAR Whelen All-American Series.

Major events held at Spencer Speedway
NASCAR Whelen All-American Series
NASCAR North Tour (1985)
NASCAR Busch North Series (1987 and 1994)
NASCAR Whelen Modified Tour (1985–1987, 1994, 2008–2009)
ISMA Supermodifieds
Race of Champions Modified Tour
SST Racing Series
NHRA Drag Racing
Super Six Series (NASCAR Sanctioned in 2007)
Auto Value Scorpions

Saturday Night Sister Speedway
Chemung Speedrome - Chemung, New York

Track Staff
Track Owner - John White 
Announcer - Joe Marotta 
Race Director -Dave Johnston  
Track Handicapper - Melissa Brusso  
NASCAR Licenses - Meghan D'Hondt and Colleen D'Hondt  
Scoreboard - Don Toal 
Scorers - Gary Spaid and Donna Spaid  
Head Flagger - Michael Myers  
Assistant Flagger - Brian Steurrys 
Corner Workers - Jeff Tack, Glenn Whitney, Wilfred Ahart III and Todd Rockefeller 
Chief Tech Inspector - Chuck Deridder 
Assistant Tech Inspectors - Mama Deridder and Michael Bixby 
Pace Car Driver - Tom Hill 
Track Crew - Doug Montgomery 
Official Track Photographers - Ron Rigby, Tom Starsmore
Official Track Videographers - Half~Fast Video Productions 
Ticketing - Marilyn Toal 
Marketing -  
Typesetting for Programs - Rich Mendoza

External links
 Official Website
Spencer Speedway archive at Racing-Reference

Motorsport venues in New York (state)
NASCAR tracks
Sports venues in Wayne County, New York
1955 establishments in New York (state)
Sports venues completed in 1955